The Dassault MD.454 Mystère IV is a 1950s French fighter-bomber aircraft, the first transonic aircraft to enter service with the French Air Force. It was used in large-scale combat in the Israeli Air Force during the 1967 Six Day War.

Design and development
The Mystère IV was an evolutionary development of the Mystère II aircraft. Although bearing an external resemblance to the earlier aircraft, the Mystère IV was in fact a new design with aerodynamic improvements for supersonic flight.  The prototype first flew on 28 September 1952, and the aircraft entered service in April 1953. The first 50 Mystere IVA production aircraft were powered by British Rolls-Royce Tay turbojets, while the remainder had the French-built Hispano-Suiza Verdon 350 version of that engine.

Operational history

Israeli Mystère IVs saw action during the Arab–Israeli wars and were joined by the French Mystères for the Suez crisis.

France
France was the main operator of the Mystère IV and at the peak usage operated 6 squadrons. Most of the aircraft were purchased under a United States Offshore Procurement contract
 and many were returned to US custody after they were retired. In April 1953 the United States government and the United States Air Force placed an order for 223 aircraft to be operated by the French.

The new Mystère IVs were used in the 1956 Suez Crisis and continued in use into the 1980s.

Israel
The Mystère IV became Israel's first swept-wing fighter when an order for Mystère IIs was changed to 24 Mystère IVs in 1955, which were delivered from April to June 1956, equipping 101 Squadron. A further 36 were delivered in August 1956, with a final aircraft, equipped for reconnaissance duties, delivered in September 1956.

On 29 October 1956, when Israel attacked Egypt in the opening move of what became known as the Suez Crisis, invading the Sinai Peninsula, the Mystères of 101 Squadron were deployed on both air-to-air and ground attack missions. On 30 October the Mystère IV got its first kill when eight aircraft fought 16 Egyptian Air Force MiG-15s. The Mystères shot down one MiG while a second MiG and one of the Mystères were damaged. On the next day, two Mystères engaged claimed four Egyptian De Havilland Vampires shot down, with another MiG-15 and a MiG-17 claimed later that day. Israeli Mystères flew a total of 147 sorties during the war, for the loss of a single aircraft, shot down by ground fire on 2 November.

A second squadron, 109 Squadron was equipped with the Mystère IV in December 1956, while 101 Squadron passed its Mystères to 116 Squadron in November 1961. Israel planned to replace the Mystère IV with the Douglas A-4 Skyhawk, but 109 and 116 Squadron still operated the French fighter on the outbreak of the Six-Day War. The Mystère was used as a ground attack aircraft during the war, flying 610 sorties, claiming three Arab aircraft (two MiG-17s and a Jordanian Hawker Hunter) shot down for the loss of seven Mystères, five to ground fire and two by enemy fighters (one by an Egyptian MiG-21 and one by a Jordanian Hunter flown by PAF pilot Saiful azam).

The Mystère was finally retired from Israeli service on 18 March 1971.

India
India procured 104 aircraft in 1957 and used them extensively in the Indo-Pakistani War of 1965.

On 16 September 1965 a Mystère IVA shot down a Pakistani L-19. On 7 September an Indian Mystère was damaged in the air by a Pakistani Lockheed F-104 Starfighter in a raid over Sargoda. The much faster Starfighter inadvertently accelerated in front of the Mystère and was shot down. Both the Mystère and the Starfighter crashed. The Pakistani pilot was able to eject and parachute down safely but the Indian air force pilot Devayya died in the crash and was awarded the Maha Vir Chakra posthumously, 23 years after the battle.

During the beginning of this offensive a PAF F-104 shot down an Indian Air Force Mystère IV with one of its sidewinders making the first combat kill with a Mach 2-capable aircraft

During the campaign Mystère IVs also destroyed Pakistani aircraft on the ground including four F-86F, three F-104 and 2 Lockheed C-130 Hercules transports.

The phasing out of the aircraft started soon after the 1965 Indo-Pakistani War, though it saw further action in the Indo-Pakistani War of 1971, it was completely phased out of the Indian Air Force by 1973.

Variants
Mystère IV
 Prototype powered by a Rolls-Royce Tay 250 engine

Mystère IVA
 Production fighter-bomber, 421 built, first 50 with the Rolls-Royce Tay 250 the remaining 371 with a French derivative of the Tay, the Hispano-Suiza Verdon.

Mystère IVB
 In addition to production Mystère IVA, Dassault developed an upgraded Mystère IVB with either Rolls-Royce Avon (first two prototypes) or SNECMA Atar 101 (third prototype) afterburning engine and a radar ranging gunsight. Six pre-production aircraft were built but the project was abandoned in favour of the promising Super Mystère. In 1954, French pilot Constantin Rozanoff was killed while doing a low-level flyover of this aircraft.

Mystère IVN
 Dassault also proposed a two-seat all-weather interceptor version called Mystère IVN. The aircraft was equipped with the AN/APG-33 radar in an arrangement similar to North American F-86D Sabre Dog, powered by a Rolls-Royce Avon turbojet, and armed with 55× 68 mm Matra rockets in a retractable belly tray. The first prototype flew on 19 July 1954. AdA eventually decided to purchase Sud Aviation Vautour and F-86K Sabre for the interceptor role but the Mystère IVN prototype continued to fly for several years as a testbed for radar equipment.

Operators

 French Air Force, 241 delivered

 Indian Air Force, 110 delivered

 Israeli Air Force, 61 delivered.

Specifications (Mystère IVA)

See also

Record setting pilots
 Jacqueline Auriol

References

Notes

Bibliography

External links

 Dassault Aviation Mystère IV page

Mystere IV
1950s French fighter aircraft
Low-wing aircraft
Single-engined jet aircraft
Cruciform tail aircraft
Aircraft first flown in 1952